Mosuke (written: 茂助 or 喪助) is a masculine Japanese given name. Notable people with the name include:

, Japanese samurai
, Japanese dermatologist

Japanese masculine given names